Frederick Le Gros Clark may refer to:
 Frederick Le Gros Clark (author), British children's author and an expert on malnutrition
 Frederick Le Gros Clark (surgeon), British surgeon

See also
 Frederick Clark (disambiguation)